Erythrospermum is a genus of flowering plants belonging to the family Achariaceae.

Its native range is Western Indian Ocean, Sri Lanka, Malesia to Southwestern Pacific.

Species:

Erythrospermum acuminatissimum 
Erythrospermum ampullaceum 
Erythrospermum boivinianum 
Erythrospermum candidum 
Erythrospermum capitatum 
Erythrospermum coffeaefolium 
Erythrospermum corymbosum 
Erythrospermum crassipes 
Erythrospermum laurei 
Erythrospermum monticola 
Erythrospermum nossibeense 
Erythrospermum pervillei 
Erythrospermum recurvifolium 
Erythrospermum richardianum 
Erythrospermum rignyanum 
Erythrospermum sifarii 
Erythrospermum sparsiflorum 
Erythrospermum zeylanicum

References

Achariaceae
Malpighiales genera